Marjorie C. Decker is an American politician serving as the State Representative for the 25th Middlesex district in the Massachusetts General Court.

Early life and education 
Decker was born and raised in North Cambridge, Massachusetts. She grew up in public housing in Cambridgeport, and she graduated from high school at the Cambridge Rindge and Latin School. She received her Bachelor of Arts in social thought and political economy from the University of Massachusetts, Amherst, an MPA from the University of Massachusetts Boston, and a Master of Science from the John F. Kennedy School of Government of Harvard University in 2007.

Career 
She served seven consecutive terms on the Cambridge City Council in Cambridge, Massachusetts from 1999 to 2013 and was the youngest woman ever to be elected to the Cambridge City Council.

In 2012 she was elected state representative to the Massachusetts legislature with her term starting in 2013.

She lives with her husband, and two children in Cambridge.

See also
 2019–2020 Massachusetts legislature
 2021–2022 Massachusetts legislature

References

External links 
 Marjorie C. Decker Representative, official page at Massachusetts State Legislature

Living people
Democratic Party members of the Massachusetts House of Representatives
Harvard Kennedy School alumni
21st-century American politicians
Women state legislators in Massachusetts
Cambridge Rindge and Latin School alumni
University of Massachusetts Amherst College of Social and Behavioral Sciences alumni
University of Massachusetts Boston alumni
Year of birth missing (living people)
21st-century American women politicians